K. Babu (Malayalam: കെ ബാബു) is the member of 14th Kerala Legislative Assembly. He is a member of Communist Party of India (Marxist) and represents Nemmara constituency.

Political career
Babu started his political life as a member of SFI. He was a leader of DYFI.

He was the President of Nemmara Block Panchayath from 1995 to 2000. He was the member of Palakkad District Panchayath representing Nemmara Division, from 2000 to 2005. He was the President of Nemmara (gram panchayat) from 2005 to 2010.

Babu is the Secretary of Palakkad District Committee of Auto Taxi Workers' Union (CITU).
He is a member of Palakkad District Committee of Communist Party of India (Marxist). He was the secretary of Nemmara Local Committee of Communist Party of India (Marxist). He was the secretary of Kollengode Area Committee of Communist Party of India (Marxist).

He was elected to Kerala Legislative Assembly in 2016.

See also
 Kerala Legislature
 V. Chenthamarakshan
 K. D. Prasenan
 K. Krishnankutty
 A. K. Balan
 P. Unni
 P. K. Sasi
 K. V. Vijayadas
 Muhammed Muhsin
 P. K. Biju
 U. R. Pradeep

References 

People from Palakkad district
Communist Party of India (Marxist) politicians from Kerala
Kerala MLAs 2016–2021
Year of birth missing (living people)
Living people